Marcelo Yarad (born October 4, 1969) is a Chilean sport shooter. He competed at the 2000 Summer Olympics in the men's skeet event, in which he tied for ninth place.

References

1969 births
Living people
Skeet shooters
Shooters at the 2000 Summer Olympics
Chilean male sport shooters
Olympic shooters of Chile
20th-century Chilean people